The 1975 WCT World Doubles was a men's tennis tournament played on indoor carpet courts in Mexico City, Mexico that was part of the 1975 World Championship Tennis circuit. It was the tour finals for the doubles season of the WCT Tour. The tournament was held from April 30 through May 4, 1975. Title holders Bob Hewitt and Frew McMillan had qualified for the tournament but were not allowed to compete by the Mexican authorities in an apparent protest against South Africa's apartheid policy. They were replaced by Vijay and Anand Amritraj.

Final

 Brian Gottfried /  Raúl Ramírez defeated  Mark Cox /  Cliff Drysdale 7–6(8–6), 6–7(7–5), 6–2, 7–6(8–6)

Special match
As Hewitt and McMillan were unable to compete in Mexico a special match for the title was played on May 12 in Dallas, U.S.:
 Brian Gottfried /  Raúl Ramírez defeated  Bob Hewitt /  Frew McMillan 7–5, 6–3, 4–6, 2–6, 7–5

References

External links
 ITF tournament edition details

World Championship Tennis World Doubles
1975 World Championship Tennis circuit
1975 in Mexican tennis
April 1975 events in Mexico
May 1975 events in Mexico
April 1975 sports events in North America
May 1975 sports events in North America
Tennis tournaments in Mexico
Sport in Mexico City